The GP15D is a four-axle B-B switcher built by MotivePower and Electro-Motive Diesel. Ten units were manufactured by EMD during June 2000. Another 10 units were manufactured for Amtrak by MotivePower during 2004. The GP15D is a hood unit with lowered long and short hoods based on MotivePower' earlier MP1500D locomotives. The changes between the MP1500D and the GP15D are primarily in the control electronics, making them easier to use than the older model. Although the GP15D was marketed as a switcher, it has a top speed of 70 mph (113 km/h), making it suitable for road switcher duties as well. The GP15D is also similar in appearance to the contemporaneous GP20D, except that the 20 GP15D units produced to date do not have dynamic brakes.

See also
 List of GM-EMD locomotives

References

External links

B-B locomotives
Railway locomotives introduced in 2000
GP15D
Diesel-electric locomotives of the United States
EPA Tier 2-compliant locomotives of the United States
Amtrak locomotives
Standard gauge locomotives of the United States